Guzmania dissitiflora is a species of flowering plant in the Bromeliaceae family. It is native to Ecuador, Colombia, Panama and Costa Rica.

References

dissitiflora
Flora of Ecuador
Flora of Colombia
Flora of Panama
Flora of Costa Rica
Plants described in 1888
Taxa named by Édouard André
Taxa named by Lyman Bradford Smith